Châtelneuf is a commune in the Jura department in Bourgogne-Franche-Comté in eastern France. It is around 8 km south of Champagnole.

Population

See also
Communes of the Jura department

References

Communes of Jura (department)